Live at the Wheelhouse is the debut extended play by American contemporary Christian music band We the Kingdom, which was released via Capitol Christian Music Group on October 25, 2019.

The EP was preceded by the release of "Dancing on the Waves" and "Holy Water" as singles. The latter went on to become the band's breakthrough hit, peaking at No. 2 on the Hot Christian Songs chart.

The EP garnered mixed reactions from music critics but managed to attain commercial success having reached No 3 on the US Christian Albums chart.

Background
The EP was recorded at the Young Life SharpTop Cove in Jasper, Georgia. Franni Cash shared in an interview with Ross Cluver of CCM Magazine that the EP's name was developed from the name of the clubhouse at SharpTop called the wheelhouse, hence the name, Live at the Wheelhouse.

Singles
"Dancing on the Waves" was released as the first single from Live at the Wheelhouse on August 16, 2019. "Holy Water" was released on September 13, 2019, as the second single from the EP. The song was the band's breakthrough hit single, peaking at No. 6 on the US Bubbling Under Hot 100 Singles chart, No. 2 on Hot Christian Songs chart, and No. 1 on Christian Airplay.

Critical reception

In a positive review from 365 Days of Inspiring Media, Joshua Andre lauded We the Kingdom for being "extremely good" on their debut project, and remarked the band "is probably the most energetic band since Rend Collective." Hallels' Timothy Yap gave a negative review of the EP, acknowledging that the band "straddled the tacit divide between raw expressions of worship and the polished stadium-filling explosions of praise well," but described some songs on the EP as being lyrically ambiguous.

Accolades

Commercial performance
Over two months after its release, Live at the Wheelhouse debuted at No. 36 on the US Christian Albums chart dated January 6, 2020. In its eleventh appearance on the Christian chart, the EP peaked at No. 12 on March 21, 2020, while also registered on Heatseekers Albums Chart at No. 23. The EP surged to its No. 3 peak in its thirteenth week on the Christian Albums chart dated April 4, 2020, concurrently debuting and on the Top Album Sales at No. 52.

Track listing

 Songwriting credits adapted from PraiseCharts.

Charts

Weekly charts

Year-end charts

Release history

References

External links
  on PraiseCharts

2019 debut EPs
We the Kingdom albums